Clee may refer to 
 Clee Hills, a range of hills in Shropshire, England
Brown Clee Hill, the highest point in the county of Shropshire, in the Clee Hills.
Titterstone Clee Hill, a hill in the Clee Hills, Shropshire
Clee Hill Junction, a railway junction in Shropshire
Cleehill, a village in Shropshire
 Old Clee, a village in Lincolnshire, England 
 New Clee, a suburb of Grimsby, Lincolnshire
New Clee railway station, a railway station serving New Clee
Clee Park, the original ground of Grimsby Town F. C. (1880 - 1889)

See Also Cleethorpes

People with the surname Clee
 Lester H. Clee (1888 - 1962), American clergyman